Till Midnight is the fourth studio album by Chuck Ragan, which was recorded in 2013 and produced by Christopher Thorn. The album was recorded at the Fireside Sound and Fonogenic Studios in Los Angeles. Guest vocalists include Ben Nichols (of Lucero), Dave Hause (of The Loved Ones), Jenny O., Chad Price, and Jon Snodgrass (of Drag the River).

Critical reception

At Alternative Press, Jason Schreurs rated the album four-and-a-half stars, stating that "there aren't many stronger Americana albums than Till Midnight." Amy Sciarretto of Outburn rated the album a nine out of ten, writing that the release "is distinctly American, and it's the kind of folk rock that appeals to the tattooed punk rockers."

Track listing

References

External links
Chuck Ragan
Chuck Ragan at SideOneDummy Records

Chuck Ragan albums
2014 albums
SideOneDummy Records albums